The Tenth Street Bridge is a concrete arch bridge in Great Falls, Montana, spanning the Missouri River. The bridge was designed by engineer Ralph Adams of Spokane, Washington and Great Falls architect George Shanley, and was completed in 1920. It was the longest open-spandrel ribbed concrete arch bridge in Montana.

The construction of a new bridge at Ninth Street in the 1990s made the bridge redundant, and it was proposed for demolition. Preservationists successfully diverted demolition funds to bridge preservation, and the bridge is being repaired to function as a pedestrian bridge between Great Falls and the Black Eagle community.

See also
List of bridges documented by the Historic American Engineering Record in Montana

References

External links

Preservation-Cascade Inc.

Bridges completed in 1920
Road bridges on the National Register of Historic Places in Montana
Buildings and structures in Great Falls, Montana
Transportation in Cascade County, Montana
Historic American Engineering Record in Montana
National Register of Historic Places in Cascade County, Montana
Concrete bridges in the United States
Open-spandrel deck arch bridges in the United States
Bridges over the Missouri River